Anton Musiyenko (born October 31, 1997) is a Ukrainian professional basketball player for Kharkivski Sokoly in the Ukrainian Basketball Superleague.

Early life
Musiyenko was born in Kharkiv, Ukraine.

Club career
In 28 October 2019, Musiyenko signed with Kharkivski Sokoly of the Ukrainian Basketball Superleague.

References

1997 births
Living people
BC Kharkivski Sokoly players
BC Kyiv players
Kyiv-Basket players
MBC Mykolaiv players
Shooting guards
Ukrainian men's basketball players